Dream TV may refer to:
Dream TV (video game), a side-scrolling action video game for the Super NES
Dream TV (Egypt), Arabic satellite television channel headquartered in Egypt
Dream TV (Turkey), Turkish music channel
Dream Satellite TV, television broadcasting service via satellite in the Philippines